The Liverpool, Crosby and Southport Railway (LC&SR) received parliamentary authorization on 2 July 1847 and opened between Southport and Liverpool, on 24 July 1848. The Liverpool terminal was a temporary station on the viaduct passing near to Waterloo Goods station.

LC&SR later operations
The line was extended from Waterloo Goods Station to Liverpool Tithebarn Street/Liverpool Exchange, the station had two names, which later settled on the name Liverpool Exchange station, on 13 May 1850.  The original Southport terminus was at Eastbank Street, until that station was closed on the opening of the current Chapel Street station on 22 August 1851.

Operations by the Lancashire & Yorkshire Railway
The LC&SR became part of the Lancashire and Yorkshire Railway (LYR), on 14 June 1855. The LYR electrified the line, using the third-rail system, and services started on 5 April 1904. The Lancashire and Yorkshire Railway amalgamated with the London and North Western Railway on 1 January 1922 and in turn was Grouped into the London, Midland and Scottish Railway in 1923.

British Railways and later operations
Nationalisation followed in 1948, and the line was destined for closure under the 1960s Beeching plan but survived. In 1978 it became part of the Merseyrail Network's Northern Line, operated by British Rail until it was privatised in 1995. Since 2003 the line has been operated by the Serco-Abellio consortium as part of its contract to operate Merseyrail.

Stations on the Liverpool and Southport line
Stations on the line serve the following places:

 Sandhills - Liverpool Docks
 Bank Hall - Liverpool Docks
 Bootle Oriel Road - Bootle
 Bootle New Strand - Bootle
 Seaforth & Litherland - Seaforth & Litherland
 Waterloo - Waterloo, Merseyside
 Blundellsands & Crosby - Crosby & Blundellsands
 Hall Road - Blundellsands
 Hightown - Hightown
 Altcar Rifle Range (closed 1921)
 Formby Power Station (closed c.1944) 
 Formby - Formby
 Freshfield - Freshfield
 Ainsdale - Ainsdale
 Hillside - Ainsdale / Birkdale
 Birkdale - Birkdale
 Southport Eastbank Street (closed 1851) - Southport
 Southport Chapel Street - Southport

Notes

References

External links

 https://web.archive.org/web/20050905222645/http://www.southportmodelrailway.org.uk/History/history.html

Historic transport in Merseyside
Pre-grouping British railway companies
Lancashire and Yorkshire Railway
Railway companies established in 1847
Railway lines opened in 1848
Railway companies disestablished in 1855
1847 establishments in England
British companies established in 1847
British companies disestablished in 1855